

P

P